Eli is the fourth solo album by the Dutch guitarist Jan Akkerman. It appeared under the name "Jan Akkerman & Kaz Lux". The track "Strindberg" was written as a tribute to August Strindberg's works.  A departure from the progressive rock that Focus (Akkerman's previous band) produced, "Eli" is a concept album with elements of jazz, pop, and funk intermixed.  It won the Netherlands' Edison Award in 1976 for Best Album.

Track listing
  "Eli" 4:25
  "Guardian Angel" 4:58
  "Tranquillizer" 4:20
  "Can't Fake a Good Time" 5:25
  "There He Still Goes" 3:45
  "Strindberg" 3:06
  "Wings of Strings" 3:15
  "Naked Actress" 5:45
  "Fairytale" 3:45

Personnel
Kaz Lux - Vocals
Jan Akkerman - Guitars, Bass guitar
Jasper van 't Hof - Keyboards
Rick van der Linden - Keyboards
Warwick Reading - Bass guitar
Pierre van der Linden - Drums
Richard DeBois - Drums
Nippy Noya - Percussion
Margriet Eshuis - Backing vocals
Maggie MacNeal - Backing vocals
Patricia Paay - Backing vocals

References

1976 albums
Jan Akkerman albums
Atlantic Records albums